African Symposium is a quarterly on-line academic journal of educational research published by the African Educational Research Network.

External links 
 

Education journals
Publications established in 2001